Dr. Psycho – Die Bösen, die Bullen, meine Frau und ich (Dr Psycho - The Bad, The Coppers, My Wife and Me) is a German crime comedy television series.
It was broadcast from 26 March 2007 to 12 August 2008 by the German private channel ProSieben in two seasons.

Plot 
The series deals with the work of a special unit for organized crime and especially with the work of the police psychologist Dr Max Munzl. He is the new guy in the department and is generally disliked at first because his colleagues don't think they need a psychologist, but rather more police colleagues.

Characters

Dr. Max Munzl 
Dr. Max Munzl is the protagonist of the series. He is trained as a police psychologist and has been moved to the department for organized crime. Arriving there, he starts immediately to analyze his colleagues and to help them with their problems. On the other hand, however, he can hardly manage his own life. His wife Lena wants to divorce him because he is clumsy, confused and oblivious. Despite the steadfast belief to save the marriage, they finally get divorced.

Kerstin Winter 
Kerstin Winter is the only woman of the department. By her increased male behaviour, however, she tries to fit into her male group of colleagues. That's why she acts as a tight policewoman without mercy within the department. Nevertheless, Max Munzl discovers very fast that she is really much more sensitive and that she owns a teddy bear, for example.

Eddie Stachowiak 
Eddie Stachowiak is the youngest colleague of the department. His colleagues don't concede much intelligence to him and he likes to work more with his hands than with his brain. At the end of the first season he gets engaged.

Victor Kellinghoff 
Victor Kellinghoff is a colleague of Max Munzl. He apparently has a drinking issue about which Max is the first to speak openly about.

Trivia 
 Dr Max Munzl owns a dog called Freud.

Response 
Dr Psycho is nominated for the coveted international television award Rose d'Or and Christian Ulmen is nominated as best main actore for the Bavarian television award in 2007. 
The public critics rated the first episodes predominantly positive:

Quotenmeter.de wrote on 23 March 2007 about the series: "«Dr Psycho» is an utmost well-done and hilarious crime comedy that stands out very positively from the presently produced and aired comedy pabulum of Germany." 
FAZ praised on 24 March 2007: "Christian Ulmen is a brilliant improvisational comedian. In the new crime series „Dr Psycho“ [...] he proves as a police psychologist how funny he is by realizing completely written screenplays." 
 Frankfurter Allgemeine Sonntagszeitung praised in the succeeding 25 March 2007 issue equally, especially Ulmen's acting skills. 
 Christian Boß wrote for Spiegel Online on 25 March 2007 (in contrast to the praise in the print issue of Spiegel): "No comedy, no crime, no style: The actually exceptionally gifted non-actor Christian Ulmen stumbles from tomorrow on with (...) psychological truisms through a new Pro-Sieben series. [...] But in Dr Psycho neither slapstick nor action works." 
 Die Welt wrote after the broadcast of the first episode a consistently positive review. According to it, there were "again and again moments with smoothed verdicts. They were mostly by the main character, perfectly cast with Christian Ulmen."
 taz wrote on 26 March 2007 about Ulmen: "That's someone who dares something." taz also wrote, he improved his acting skills in the course of the series visibly.
Süddeutsche Zeitung called Munzl "a young Columbo: sappy, racked, shuffled" in its 26 March 2007 issue. According to reviewer Senta Krasser the cast, the text, the direction and even the lead-in fits.
 Der Spiegel wrote in its printed issue 14 of 2 April 2007 on page 106: ""Actor Christian Ulmen is a godsend of the entertainers' heaven." "Dr Psycho" be "big anarchical fun."
 Medienhandbuch.de, a portal for media, IT, communication and culture describes the first episode as "a mix of bizarre intelligent to ribald humour with a proper share of action that has not existed like this in the federal German television environment until now." Script, casting and actors are praised "great".
 On popkulturjunkie.de the plot of the series is described as "not thrilling, not funny, just tough and mediocre". "Dr. Psycho" be "a kind of “Monk” for the poor".

Episodes

Season 1

Season 2

External links 

Official ProSieben webpage

References 

2007 German television series debuts
2008 German television series endings
German comedy television series
German-language television shows
ProSieben original programming
Grimme-Preis for fiction winners